Marvin Francisco Blanco Bompart (born 16 June 1988) is a Venezuelan athlete competing in the middle distance and 3000 metres steeplechase events. He has won multiple medals on continental level.

Competition record

Personal bests
1500 metres – 3:40.56 (Bilbao 2014)
3000 metres – 7:58.13 (Belém 2014)
5000 metres – 13:53.45 (Eagle Rock 2014)
3000 metres steeplechase – 8:21.78 (Huelva 2014)

References

1988 births
Living people
Sportspeople from Caracas
Venezuelan male middle-distance runners
Venezuelan male steeplechase runners
Pan American Games competitors for Venezuela
Athletes (track and field) at the 2011 Pan American Games
Athletes (track and field) at the 2015 Pan American Games
Athletes (track and field) at the 2018 South American Games
South American Games gold medalists for Venezuela
South American Games silver medalists for Venezuela
South American Games medalists in athletics
Central American and Caribbean Games gold medalists for Venezuela
Central American and Caribbean Games bronze medalists for Venezuela
Competitors at the 2010 Central American and Caribbean Games
Competitors at the 2014 Central American and Caribbean Games
Competitors at the 2018 Central American and Caribbean Games
Central American and Caribbean Games medalists in athletics
21st-century Venezuelan people